Konstantin Yuryevich Kosiakin (Russian:Константин Юрьевич Косякин) (18 January 1947 — 10 August 2013) was a Russian leftist politician, a member of the National Assembly of the Other Russia. He was a member of the Council and the Executive Committee of the Left Front, coordinator of the Mossovet movement, one of the organizers of the Strategy-31 protests, Day of Wrath, and others.

References 

Russian politicians
1947 births
2013 deaths
Amnesty International prisoners of conscience held by Russia